2-Methylbutyryl-CoA is an intermediate in the metabolism of isoleucine.

See also
 2-Methylbutyryl-CoA dehydrogenase deficiency

Thioesters of coenzyme A